Excalibur is a 1973 Arthurian fantasy novel by American writer Sanders Anne Laubenthal. It was first published by Ballantine Books as the sixtieth volume of the Ballantine Adult Fantasy series in August, 1973, and has been reprinted a number of times since.

Plot summary
The novel is set in modern times against the background of the legendary Medieval Welsh colonization of Mobile, Alabama under the prince Madoc in the 12th century. The modern Pendragon, King Arthur's secret successor, must recover Arthur's famed sword Excalibur.

Critical reception
John Clute praised Excalibur as "a powerful fantasy which conflates the matter of Britain with an American Gothic version of Mobile, Alabama."

References

1973 American novels
1973 fantasy novels
Modern Arthurian fiction
American fantasy novels
Novels set in Mobile, Alabama
Ballantine Books books